Marcos Vinicius Paineiros Santos Souza or simply Paineiras (born February 5, 1984 in Rio de Janeiro), is a central defender. He currently plays for Botafogo.

Contract
1 March 2003 to 1 March 2008

External links
CBF

1984 births
Living people
Brazilian footballers
Botafogo de Futebol e Regatas players
Association football defenders
Footballers from Rio de Janeiro (city)